Zoological Garden station was a railroad station in Philadelphia, Pennsylvania. It was located at 34th Street and Girard Avenue, it served the Philadelphia Zoo and nearby areas. Built by the Pennsylvania Railroad, it closed in 1902 as the railroad expanded. The zoo has proposed that a new station be created at 34th Street and Mantua, though the complicated network of tracks, known as Zoo interlocking, presents engineering challenges.  The zoo, recognizing that SEPTA lacks the necessary resources, is seeking funding from the federal government.

See also
 Zoo Junction
 Philadelphia Zoo

References

1874 establishments in Pennsylvania
1901 disestablishments in Pennsylvania
Railway stations in the United States opened in 1874
Former Pennsylvania Railroad stations
Former railway stations in Philadelphia
Railway stations closed in 1901